Rizu may refer to:
 Rizu, Kerman